Kimmons is a surname of Scottish and Irish origin. Notable people with the surname include:

John Kimmons, United States Army general
Rob Kimmons (born 1981), American mixed martial artist
Trell Kimmons (born 1985), American sprinter

References

Surnames of Scottish origin
Surnames of Irish origin